Queen Eleanor's Vengeance and Other Poems is a book of poetry written by William Cox Bennett, consisting of thirty-four poems printed on 232 pages, published in 1857.

Poetry books